Joseph McKeen Morrow (January 1, 1832 – July 28, 1899) was an American lawyer and politician.

Born in East Aurora, New York, he studied law in Buffalo, New York. He then moved to Sparta, Wisconsin and was admitted to the Wisconsin bar. He practices law in Sparta, Wisconsin. In 1862, Morrow served in the Wisconsin State Assembly. He was elected in a special election succeeding Simon D. Powers who died in office. He moved to Montana Territory in 1864 because of his health and stayed there until 1866. In 1893, he was appointed Wisconsin state court judge and lost the election in April 1894. During the administration of President Grover Cleveland, he was appointed collector of internal revenue. Morrow died in Sparta, Wisconsin.

Notes

1832 births
1899 deaths
People from East Aurora, New York
People from Sparta, Wisconsin
Wisconsin lawyers
Wisconsin state court judges
Members of the Wisconsin State Assembly
19th-century American politicians
19th-century American judges
19th-century American lawyers